Tom Van Hyfte (born 26 April 1986) is a Belgian professional footballer who currently plays as a midfielder for Evergem 2020 in the Belgian Provincial Leagues.

External links
 Voetbal International profile 
 

1986 births
Living people
Belgian footballers
Belgian expatriate footballers
MVV Maastricht players
Roda JC Kerkrade players
K Beerschot VA players
Oud-Heverlee Leuven players
Royal FC Mandel United players
Eredivisie players
Eerste Divisie players
Belgian Pro League players
Challenger Pro League players
Expatriate footballers in the Netherlands
Belgian expatriate sportspeople in the Netherlands
Footballers from Ghent
Association football midfielders